Phthonandria is a genus of moths in the family Geometridae. It was described by Warren in 1894.

Species
Some species of this genus are:
Phthonandria atrilineata (Butler, 1881) (India, Japan)
Phthonandria brandti (Wehrli, 1941)
Phthonandria conjunctiva Warren, 1896 (India)
Phthonandria emaria (Bremer, 1864)
Phthonandria lederi (Christoph, 1887)
Phthonandria potopolskii (Viidalepp, 1988)

References

Geometridae
Geometridae genera